The 2019 Veikkausliiga was the 89th season of top-tier football in Finland. Helsingin Jalkapalloklubi were the defending champions.

New league format
Veikkausliiga adopted a new league format for the 2019 season. Each team played against each other twice in the regular season. After the regular season the top six teams advanced to the Championship Series which determines the champion and European tournament qualification places. The bottom six teams advanced to the Challenger Series. The best team from the Challenger Series plays in a tournament against the Championship Series' 4th, 5th, and 6th place teams. The winner from that plays in a final series against the 3rd best team from the Championship Series. The last UEFA Europa League qualification place goes to the winner of that final series.

The bottom team from the Challenger Series will relegate to the Ykkönen, and second to last team will play in a relegation play-off series against the 2nd best team from Ykkönen.

Teams
Palloseura Kemi Kings were relegated to Ykkönen after finishing at the bottom of the 2018 season. Their place was taken by Ykkönen champions HIFK Fotboll.

Turun Palloseura as 11th-placed team lost their Veikkausliiga spot after losing to second-placed Ykkönen team Kokkolan Palloveikot in a relegation/promotion playoff.

Stadia and locations

League table

Regular season

Results

European competition 
Five teams will play for a spot in the 2020–21 UEFA Europa League first qualifying round.

Bracket

Final stage

Relegation play-offs

Season statistics

Top scorers
Final standings

Awards

Annual awards

Team of the Year

References

Veikkausliiga seasons
Vei
Fin
Fin